Iron Gustav (German: Der eiserne Gustav) is West German television series which originally aired on ARD in seven episodes between 27 August and 8 October 1979. It is based on the 1938 novel Iron Gustav by Hans Fallada about a Berlin taxi driver still using a horse-drawn carriage, and the hardships he faces due to increasing competition from motor cars in the Weimar Era. In 1928 to demonstrate what he can still do he takes his carriage from Berlin to Paris.

Main cast
 Gustav Knuth as Gustav Hackendahl
 Eva Brumby as Grete Hackendahl
 Eos Schopohl as Eva Hackendahl
 Volker Lechtenbrink as Erich Hackendahl 
 Michael Kausch as Heinz Hackendahl
 Erika Skrotzki as Gertrud Gudde
 Manfred Lehmann as Eugen Bast
 Dagmar Biener as Sophie Hackendahl
 Peter Eschberg as Dr. Pasolt
 Inge Landgut as  Mutter Quaas
 Gabriele Schramm as Irma Hackendahl
 Rainer Hunold as Wilhelm Hackendahl
 Valérie de Tilbourg as Tinette Blanc
 Herbert Steinmetz as  Schuldirektor
 Käthe Haack as Marlene
 Heinz Meier as Herr Tümmel
 Brigitte Mira as Frau Pauli
 Günter Strack as Bankdirektor Hoppe
 Michael Nowka as Erich Menz

References

Bibliography
 Bock, Hans-Michael & Bergfelder, Tim. The Concise CineGraph. Encyclopedia of German Cinema. Berghahn Books, 2009.
 Rentschler, Eric . German Film & Literature. Routledge, 2013.

External links
 

1979 German television series debuts
1979 German television series endings
1970s drama television series
German-language television shows
Television shows set in Berlin
Television shows set in Paris
Television series set in the 1920s
Adaptations of works by Hans Fallada